Mystère ("mystery") is one of six resident Cirque du Soleil shows in Las Vegas, Nevada. Held in a custom theatre at the Treasure Island Hotel and Casino, the show was first performed on 25 December 1993, making it the company's longest running show. As with many Cirque du Soleil productions, Mystère features a mixture of circus skills, dance, elaborate sets, opera, worldbeat music, and street theatre-style comedy. Featuring a musical score composed by René Dupéré and Benoît Jutras, the show was created under the direction of Franco Dragone.

History
The idea for Mystère started around 1990. It was originally planned for Caesars Palace with a theme based on Greek and Roman mythology. The plan, however, was scrapped by the casino executives, who thought the project would be too financially risky. Mystère was very different from the typical material they were used to in a Las Vegas show. According to Mystère set designer Michel Crête, "Vegas... was still very influenced by Folies Bergère, with the scarves, feather boas, etc. There was a European culture already in place, oddly enough, not an American one. The people who opened the door for something new were Siegfried and Roy. They were the first to move away from the Folies Bergère thing."

Treasure Island picked up the show three years later. Mystère was their first show that would have its own theater, rather than touring with a circus tent.  Mystère would have a permanent base in Las Vegas. They worked with Mirage Casino-Hotel to produce a show.

Recent milestones Mystère has achieved include:
 Mystère celebrated their 20th anniversary on 25 December 2013  
 Mystère celebrated their 10,000th show on 27 December 2014.
 Mystère celebrated their 11,111th show on 17 May 2017.

Set and technical information
The theater is a unique theater built in the Treasure Island Hotel and Casino specifically for the show. The design of the theater was created by Michel Crête and that of Montreal-based team of Scéno Plus. This theater seats 1,541 audience members. The stage measures 120 feet by 70 feet deep and covers approximately 10,032 square feet. The stage floor is made of a layer of Base Mat, which is rubber made from recycled old tires and sneakers. This helps give the stage some bounce for tumbling. This is held together by polyurethane adhesive and covered with thousands of gallons of liquid that dries onto the surface. The Downstage D Lift is 36 feet in diameter and includes a 28-foot revolving stage. The revolving stage rotates up to 10 revolutions per minute. Props, equipment, and performers are elevated to stage level from the basement or trap by four moving lifts. These moving lifts were constructed in Montreal and then assembled in Las Vegas, NV.

The snail seen growing larger throughout the show is called Alice. By the end of the show, she is a giant inflatable puppet controlled by four puppeteers from the inside. The puppeteers move her around by following markings on the floor, since they can not see outside the puppet. They also control her eyes, torso, and tail.

The taiko drums in Mystère are created by the Japanese company Asano Taiko, located in Mattō, Ishikawa Prefecture. Due to the large size of the drum, it had to be brought into the theatre during construction. Since the completion of the theatre the drum can not be removed, as no door is large enough to accommodate it.

Characters
The cast of Mystère comprises a myriad of fantastic and mysterious characters. All this information was confirmed by Mystère's artistic director from 1995 to 2001: Pavel Brun.
 Inti X & Y (Spermatos/Spermatites): A comic chorus representing the seeds of life.
 Red Bird: Convinced he can fly. According to Pavel Brun, he is the main character in the entire narrative of Mystère's universe. 
 Les Laquais: The "lackeys" of Mystère who serve and support others. They perform in the Korean plank act.
 Brian Le Petit: A troublemaker who steals people's popcorn and causes chaos both onstage and off. (2000–present)
 Chanteuses Plumes: A duo of muses who sing the emotion of all humans.
 The Firebirds: Along with the Double Faces, they perform the Chinese pole act.
 Les Bébés: Two enormous babies on a quest for nourishment. There's Big Baby (also known as Bébé François) and the Baby Girl. There was a third baby for a short period, similar to Francois, who was apart of the original 1993 cast, until his eventual removal in Mid-1994.
 Egon Egli: A strange, lanky, bespectacled youth who rides across the stage on his bicycle. No longer in the show.
 La Vache à lait: Protector of youth and a symbol of fertility. When he sounds his horn, it heralds a new beginning.
 Moha-Samedi: A man in pink, named after the first day of the new millennium. He is the narrator no one listens to, he was originally portrayed by Canadian actor Paul Ahmarani and later by Lorenzo Pisoni.
 La Belle: Afraid of ugliness, she seeks to avoid pain at all costs.
 Black Widow: The antithesis of La Belle. She represents a praying mantis who destroys the illusions and dreams of her victims. Originally portrayed by Katie Renauld
 Birds of Prey: These unpredictable birds soar and fly throughout the world of Mystère. They are graceful, yet aggressive when hungry. Originally portrayed by Lejdka Zievert and Mark Ward
 The Frog: Creepy characters witness to the strength of birth and time.
 The Green Lizards: Mischievous and skittish chameleons. There is the Male Chameleon and the Female Chameleon (who are not present in the show anymore). The Male Chameleon was originally portrayed by Karl Baumann
 Double Faces: These two-faced creatures perform in the Chinese pole act.
 Les Palmiers: Out of a purple-blue mist, these tropical ladies float by.
 Deus ex machina: The machine that regulates the existence of everything.
 The Tribe (Les Pagnes): The primitive, tragic ghosts of modern humanity. They descend from the skies to provide the earthly beat of our journey. They welcome us, and they bid us farewell. They perform in Taïko 
 Monarch Bird: A male bird introduced in 2022 as backup dancing character.
 The Prince of the Darkness: The prince of the dark side of Mystère, performed by Miguel Godreau from 1993 to 1994; he left the show for health reasons and is no longer in the show. Left before the premiere due to complications from HIV. He was originally part of the group of dancers containing La Belle, Birds Of Prey, Green Lizard and Black Widow.
 La Banane: A yellow creature with a large, bulbous head that performed with some artists from 1993 to 1995; no longer in the show. originally appeared on the Net-Up set, before Flying Trapeze.
 The Shaman: A mysterious man who creates the sounds of the world; no longer in the show. Originally portrayed by Luis Perez
 Bungee Warrior: A duo of muscle men able to fly in the air.
 The Jugglers: A trio of jugglers that performed the Manipulation act from 1993 to 1995; no longer in the show.
 The Cube Man: Exhibiting great strength and courage, he captures the attention of young souls in search of wonder.; no longer in the show. Originally played by Mikhail "Misha" Matorin, and later Paul Bowler
 The Mountain Man: An archangel who is ready to sacrifice everything. Originally know as Gabriel reffereing his archangel statut.
 Mephisto and Vénus: Part of the Giants race, they are thwarted, twisted creatures. Their presence wreaks havoc in any domain. Together they want to create chaos and destroy the balance that exists within the world of Mystère. 
 The Giants: A gentle race with feathers and long legs. There's the happy-go-lucky Pumpkin Giant, the grumpy Fly Giant, the magnificent Giraffe Giant, the rare Plume Giant (no longer in the show) and the Egg Giant, a delicate interior inside a protective shell.
 Stas Greyner: a kind of playful dwarf. Performs handbalancing since 1998.
 The Medusa: A long-appendaged creature that was part of the original cast between 1993 and 1995; no longer in the show. Appeared among the smoke and disappeared among the shadows, performed during the Net-Set Up.
 The Wheel Rider: A slightly tattered man who performed the German Wheel act from 1995 to 1997; no longer in the show. Originally played by Wolfgang Bientzle
 The Green Man: A curly-horned creature similar to a Satyr that was part of the cast from a short period in 1997, no longer in the show. Originally portrayed by Guennadi Tchijov.
 Tony: A living doll that was part of the original cast between 1993 and 1995, Originally portrayed by Tony Manducas; no longer in the show.
 The Zucchinis: Two inflatable marionettes only used in the Net Set-up for the original trapeze act; no longer in the show.
The Egg: An egg-like creature who appeared sometimes during the Overture and Bungee acts from 1993 to 1995; no longer in the show.
 Alice the Escargot: An enormous snail. Born from a spring rain, carrier of the souls of the ancestors and herald of the future.
 The Bungees: Like majestic birds in flight, the Bungees dive fearlessly through the air, creating images of unison and separation.
 Benny Le Grand: Mystères original clown, a mad professor-esque character who was more dark and bitter. He would often cause mischief either by whacking one of the Spermatos with a drumstick, throwing a loaf of bread at the red bird, drenching people with bottled water, interrupting the show as an impromptu tour guide, throwing around silver dollars, popcorn, and women's purses, harassing ticket holders, discouraging guests from seeing the show, or kidnapping an audience member and driving them around in a golf cart. (1993 - 1995, 1996 - 2000)
 Alex El Sobrino: Benny Le Grand's Spanish nephew, who was slightly more refined in personality. (1998 - 2000)
 Alfredo et Adrenaline: A comedic duo of clowns who had previously appeared in Le Cirque Reinventés European tour, and the special Zirkus Knie show. They often bickered with each other while trying to entertain the audience, from Alfredo trying to perform as a mime, to the two of them throwing paint at each other while trying to perform a song, but they soon literally kissed and made up. (1995 - 1996)

Acts
Mystère features several acrobatic acts, supplemented by clown acts and transitional scenes that advance the storyline.
 Aerial Straps Duo (2017 – present): A pair of aerialists performs twists and turns as they fly over the stage.
 Chinese Poles and Hand Balancing (2012–present): A group of acrobats climb up, jump between, and slide down four adjacent metal poles while an acrobat contorts into poses on two balancing canes on a platform above the Chinese poles.
 Hand-to-Hand (1993 – present): Two artists perform an exhibition of strength and stamina on a rotating dome.
 Bungee (1993 – present): A group of artists bounce and swing from the ceiling to the ground and back on bungees.
 Teeterboard and Power Track (2017–present): Artists perform a combination of these two skills.
 Taiko (1993 – present): A group of artists perform powerful rhythms on Japanese taiko drums.
 Flying trapeze (2012 – present): Unlike the original version where two separate trapeze towers were surrounded by a platform on one side and an aerial cradle on the other, the current version has a platform on either side. Each trapeze tower now has two trapeze bars swinging beside each other. The act and music were originally from Zed (a resident show at Tokyo Disney Resort) which closed in 2011.

Reserve acts
 Aerial Straps (1994, 2002 – present)
On reserve for the aerial straps duo; features a single artist on straps with the Black Widow or La Belle performing choreography on stage.

Retired acts
 Manipulation (1993 - 1995)
 Flying Trapeze (1993 - 1995)
 German Wheel (1995 - 1997)
 Dual High Bar (1996 - 2012)
 Flying Man in Silk (1997)
 Aerial Cube (1996, 1998 – 2015)
 Chinese Poles (1993 - 2011)
 Trampoline, Fast Track, and Korean plank/Teeterboard (1993 - 2017)
 Aerial Straps and Cube (2016 – 2017)
 Aerial Silk (2012 – 2017)

Acts used in the film Cirque du Soleil: Journey of Man (2000)
 Taiko
 Aerial cube
 Aerial straps

Acts used in the film Cirque du Soleil: Worlds Away (2012)
 Aerial cube

Costumes
Dominique Lemieux took inspiration from nature to create the colorful costumes of Mystère. One such costume is the Firebird, which has red feathers and accents that give the impression of embers flying through the air. The odd-looking Spermatos and Spermatites are dressed in elongated costumes which bulge in the center and have a tendril-like feature on the head. To give the characters an organic nature, spandex/lycra was used in conjunction with fringes and borders.

Music
The original score of Mystère was composed by René Dupéré, who had composed all of Cirque du Soleil's earlier shows, including Nouvelle Expérience and Saltimbanco. In 1994 the show's music was released as a studio album featuring the vocals of Canadian singers Élise Gouin (now known as Élise Velle) and Nathalie Gauvin.

In 1995 the show underwent an artistic overhaul, including changes in the lineup of acts. The "Manipulation" act was replaced by the "Aerial Cube", the Flying Trapeze act by the Aerial High Bars (the Flying Trapeze returned in 2012), and the Acro Net setup dance act was excluded from the show. At the same time the musical score was renovated with assistance from Benoît Jutras, a longtime music director and arranger for Cirque who later went on to compose for Quidam and other Cirque shows. The result, captured in the album Mystère: Live in Las Vegas, was a score that reflects the diverse compositional styles of both composers.  Mystère: Live in Las Vegas is a live, in-house recording of the new score, featuring Nathalie Gauvin and Wendy Talley on vocals; the album was released on November 12, 1996. After the release of the live album, the music was rearranged and altered once again. While the album resembles the current live music closely, it is not identical. For the celebration of the 25th anniversary of the show in 2018, a vinyl album specifically dedicated to the employees was created in limited quantities, just as it was done for the show Alegria in 1994 and Saltimbanco in 1997.

Below are the track lists for the 1994, 1996 and 2018 Mystère soundtrack albums. Acts are listed next to the songs they have accompanied in the show.

 1994 studio album
 Égypte (Chinese poles intro)
 Rumeurs (Manipulation, 1993 - 1995)
 Birimbau (Flying Trapeze, 1993 - 1995)
 Kunya Sobé (Bungee pt. 2 (1993 - 2012, 2018–2022), complete Bungee act (2012–2017) )
 En Ville (Trampoline, fast track/power track, Korean plank/teeterboard)
 Ulysse (Hand-to-hand (1993 - present) Main à Main (1993 - 1995; 1996 - 1998) Solo Aerial Straps (1994) )
 Rondo (Chinese poles and Handbalancing)
 Caravena (Interlude (Set Up for Flying Trapeze), 1993 - 1995)
 Kalimando (Aerial silk (2012 - 2017), Bungee pt. 1 (1993 - 2012, 2018 - present) )

 1996 live album (Live in Las Vegas)
 Ouverture/Ramsani (Opening 1993 - present)
 Misha (Aerial cube (1996 - 2015), Solo Aerial Straps (2002 - 2015), Flying Man in Silk (1997), Duo Aerial Straps (2018 - Present) )
 Égypte (Chinese poles intro 1993 - present)
 Rondo/Double Face (Chinese poles and Handbalancing 1993 - present)
 Ulysse (Hand-to-Hand (1993–present) Main à Main (1993 - 1995; 1996 - 1998) Solo Aerial Straps (1994) )
 Dôme (Interlude from Hand-to-Hand)
 Kalimando (Aerial silk (2012 – 2017), Bungee pt. 1 (1993 - 2012, 2018–present) )
 Kunya Sobé (Bungee pt. 2 (1993 - 2012, 2018 - 2022), complete Bungee act (2012 - 2017) )
 En Ville/Frisco (Trampoline (1993 - 2016), Fast Track/Power Track, Korean Plank/Teeterboard (1993 - 2017) )
 Gambade (Finale interlude (1993 - 1995) Dance interlude and Dei ex Machina (1993 - 2017) )
 High Bar (Dual high bar (1996 - 2010), Intro to dual high bar (2010 - 2012) )
 Taïko (Taiko drumming)
 Finale (Finale, 1996 - Present)

 2018 vinyl live album (twenty-five LIVE)
 Ouverture/Ramsani (Opening 1993 - present)
 Misha (Duo Aerial Straps, 2018 - present)
 Égypte (Chinese poles intro 1993 - present)
 Rondo/Double Face (Chinese poles and Handbalancing 1993 - present)
 Ulysse (Hand-to-hand (1993 – present) Main à Main (1993 - 1995; 1996 - 1998) Solo Aerial Straps (1994) )
 Dôme (Interlude from hand-to-hand)
 Kalimando (Aerial silk (2012 – 2017), bungee pt. 1 (1993 - 2012, 2018–present) )
 Kunya Sobé (Bungee pt. 2 (1993 - 2012, 2018 - 2022), complete Bungee act (2012 - 2017) )
 Convergence (Teeterboard and power track (2017 – present) )
 Rogue (Planche Dance interlude and Dei ex Machina (2017–present) )
 Fiesta (originally from Zed) (Flying Trapeze, 2012–present)
 Strike of the Net (Set-Up to Taiko drumming)
 Finale (Finale, 1996 - Present)

Songs not appearing on either album:
 Alice (Ending, 1993 - 1995. Updated version of song right after "Finale," 1995 - present)
 Benny (Clown act, 1996 – present)
 Mime (Clown act, 1995 - 1996)
 Bolero (Clown act, 1995 - 1996)
 Benny Le Grand (Clown act, 1993 - 1995)
 Cercles (German Wheel, 1995 - 1997)
 High Bar II (Dual high bar, 2010 - 2012)
 Avos (Bungee, 2022 - Present)
 Hell/Angel (Dei ex machina, 1993 – present)
 Rampant (Chineses poles Exit)
 Nouvel Envol (Aerial cube, 2015 - 2017) (Solo Aerial Straps, 2015–present) (Duo Aerial Straps, 2017 - 2018)
 Love Over (Duo Aerial Straps, 2018 - present)

 Vocalists
Singer 1
 Nathalie Gauvin: Dec 1993 - Dec 2005
 Jeannette D' Armand: 2000 (temporarily replaced Nathalie Gauvin)
 Mirjana Milovanovic: Jan 2006 - Jul 2007
 Sarah Boucher: Jul 2007 - Sep 2009
 Silje Marie Norderhaugh: Sep 2009 - Jan 2013
 Anna Bille: Jan 2013 - Dec 2014, Oct 2017
 Kailee Ann: Dec 2014 - Aug 2017
 Mackenzie Thomas: April 2018 - Present 
Singer 2
 Elise "Gouin" Velle: Dec 1993 - Sep 1994
 Wendy Talley: Sep 1994 - Dec 1997, 1998 (temporarily replaced Chantal Hamel)
 Chantal Hamel: Dec 1997 - Jul 1999
 Stacey Beth Sanford: Jul 1999 - Dec 2000
 Dina Emerson: Jan 2001 - Jan 2002, Apr 2007 - Jun 2017
 Rochelle Collins: Jan 2002 - Jul 2003, Oct 2003 - May 2007
 Briana Rossi: Jun 2017 - July 2021 
 Brittany Mae: July 2021 - Present 
Singer 3
 Luis Perez: Dec 1993 - Jul 1996

In popular culture
 Mystère was a featured guest performance on Lopez Tonight, airing December 20, 2010. The featured acts included the hand-to-hand and aerial cube acts.
 In the film Knocked Up, the main characters watched Mystère.
 In the webseries Dorm Life, the character Courtney Cloverlock, a huge Cirque du Soleil fan, has posters of both Mystère and Love by her bed.
 Yuji Naka, creator of the video game Nights into Dreams…, has cited Mystère as an inspiration for the game.
 Mystère did a performance collaboration with alternative rock band Imagine Dragons for the Life is Beautiful Festival.

References

 Cirque Du Soleil - 20 Years Under the Sun, by Tony Babinsky, 2004.
 Mystère - Music Composed by René Dupéré & Benoît Jutras, transcription for piano and voices by Jean-Francois Brissette, music engraving and book design by Yvon Hubert, 1997.

External links 

 Official website of Cirque du Soleil about Mystère
 Mystère still a wonderland at Treasure Island at LasVegas.com
 Mystère by Cirque du Soleil: Full Review at Vegas4Visitors

Cirque du Soleil resident shows
Production shows in the Las Vegas Valley
Las Vegas shows